Chapter Ten or Chapter 10 may refer to:

Music
 Chapter 10, a 2013 album by Filipino singer and television personality Jake Zyrus (also Charice)
 "Chapter 10", the tenth song from Matthew Shipp's 2015 album The Gospel According to Matthew & Michael
 "Chapter Ten", the tenth song from Kendrick Lamar's 2011 debut studio album Section.80

Television
 "Chapter 10" (American Horror Story), the tenth and final episode of the sixth season of the anthology television series American Horror Story
 "Chapter 10", a season one episode of the American political thriller streaming television series House of Cards
 "Chapter 10: The Passenger", the second episode of the second season of the American streaming television series The Mandalorian